Adventure (Swedish: Äventyret) is a 1936 Swedish drama film directed by Per-Axel Branner and starring Karin Swanström, Tutta Rolf and Olof Winnerstrand. It was shot at the Råsunda Studios in Stockholm and on location in Täby. The film's sets were designed by the art director Arne Åkermark. It is based on 1913 play The Beautiful Adventure by Gaston Arman de Caillavet, Robert de Flers and Étienne Rey, adapted several times into films including the later 1942 French production The Beautiful Adventure.

Plot summary

Cast
 Karin Swanström as von Bohren
 Tutta Rolf as 	Heléne von Bohren
 Olof Winnerstrand as 	Count Knut Lagercrona
 Elsa Carlsson as Countess Lagercrona
 Håkan Westergren as Karl Henrik Lagercrona
 Sture Lagerwall as 	Sebastian Lavenius
 Frida Winnerstrand as 	von Ackerman
 Irma Christenson as Daisy
 Elsa Ebbesen as 	Tilda
 Hjördis Petterson as 	Four times married wife
 Astrid Bodin as 	Lagercronas husa 
 Carl Browallius as 	Läkaren 
 Bellan Roos as	Änkefru von Borens husa 
 Carl Ström as 	Lönnvall, generaldirektör 
 Märta Dorff as 	Karl Henriks sekreterare 
 George Fant as 	Ung man
 Olav Riégo as	Prästen 
 Jullan Jonsson as 	Fröken Berg
 Ernst Fastbom as 	Bröllopsgäst 
 Knut Frankman as 	Tågkonduktör 
 Sven-Eric Gamble as Pojke
 Anna-Stina Wåglund as 	Helenes sömmerska

References

Bibliography 
 Krawc, Alfred. International Directory of Cinematographers, Set- and Costume Designers in Film: Denmark, Finland, Norway, Sweden (from the beginnings to 1984). Saur, 1986.
 Qvist, Per Olov & von Bagh, Peter. Guide to the Cinema of Sweden and Finland. Greenwood Publishing Group, 2000.

External links 
 

1936 films
Swedish drama films
1936 drama films
1930s Swedish-language films
Films directed by Per-Axel Branner
Swedish films based on plays
1930s Swedish films